Piemontite is a sorosilicate mineral in the monoclinic crystal system with the chemical formula . It is a member of the epidote group.

Red to reddish-brown or red-black in color, Piemontite has a red streak and a vitreous lustre.  Manganese (Mn3+) causes the red color.

The type locality is the Prabornaz Mine, in Saint-Marcel, Aosta Valley, Italy.

It occurs metamorphic rocks of the greenschist to amphibolite metamorphic facies and in low-temperature hydrothermal veins in altered volcanic rocks. It also occurs in metasomatized deposits of manganese ore. Associated minerals include: epidote, tremolite, glaucophane, orthoclase, quartz and calcite.

References

Epidote group
Calcium minerals
Aluminium minerals
Manganese(III) minerals
Monoclinic minerals
Minerals in space group 11